Eurovision: Come Together was a one-off television programme, organised and broadcast by the BBC, to determine the most popular song in the 64-year history of the Eurovision Song Contest, as voted for by the British public.

Hosted by Graham Norton, the event was broadcast from Television Centre, London on 16 May 2020, and served as an alternative for the Eurovision Song Contest 2020, which was cancelled because of the COVID-19 pandemic. Nineteen past Eurovision entries, chosen by an assembled jury, took part in the event, with the winner determined by online voting.

Background

The Eurovision Song Contest 2020, which was planned to be held in Rotterdam, Netherlands on 12, 14 and 16 May 2020, was officially cancelled on 18 March 2020 by the contest organisers, the European Broadcasting Union (EBU) and the Dutch broadcasters NPO, NOS and AVROTROS, following the outbreak of COVID-19 in Europe.

As part of a wide range of new programming commissioned following the cancellation of several arts and entertainment events as a result of the pandemic, the BBC announced on 24 March 2020 that they would commission a special Eurovision broadcast, Eurovision: Come Together. The special would be produced by BBC Studios for BBC One, and feature past Eurovision performances from throughout the years, interviews, and a display of what had been anticipated for the 2020 contest.

The EBU, NPO, NOS and AVROTROS later confirmed that they would organise an official replacement programme to the 2020 edition, entitled Eurovision: Europe Shine a Light and broadcast live from Hilversum on 16 May 2020, the day on which the grand final would have taken place. Initial reports suggested that the BBC would air Eurovision: Come Together on BBC One at the same time, with Europe Shine a Light being offered to UK viewers instead through BBC iPlayer. The BBC programming schedule for Eurovision, released on 1 May 2020, confirmed that Europe Shine a Light would be broadcast live on BBC One, with Graham Norton providing commentary, and that Eurovision: Come Together would be shown immediately before. This press release also confirmed that Eurovision: Come Together would give viewers the opportunity to take part in a live vote.

Selection process

The shortlist of competing entries for the competitive aspect of the programme was determined by a group of assembled individuals with a connection to Eurovision. The membership of the panel included British broadcasters and journalists, former UK Eurovision contestants, as well as members of the Eurovision fandom and contributors to Eurovision fansites.

Panelists were asked to select ten Eurovision songs from the history of the Eurovision Song Contest, including all songs that had taken part in the contest before 2020. Any entries which were to have competed at the 2020 contest were ineligible. The criteria against which the panelists were asked to rate the entries outlined that the songs selected should be "modern day classics" that "have stood the test of time", taking into account the performance, including live vocals and staging, and song composition. Any entry in which an individual panelist was involved in its original performance, either directly as singer or songwriter, or in a behind-the-scenes role, such as vocal coach or publicist, was ineligible for selection by that panelist.

The selection panel consisted of the following 18 members:

 Rylan Clark-Neal – UK semi-final commentator
 Scott Mills – UK semi-final commentator
 Mel Giedroyc – Eurovision: You Decide host and former UK semi-final commentator
 Ken Bruce – BBC Radio 2 broadcaster and Eurovision commentator
 Adele Roberts – BBC Radio 1 DJ and UK Eurovision jury member in 
 Mark De-Lisser – Vocal coach
 Nicki French –  and London Eurovision Party co-host
 Paul Jordan, a.k.a. Dr. Eurovision – Eurovision pundit
 Heidi Stephens – TV blogger for The Guardian
 Steve Holden – Music reporter for BBC Radio 1's Newsbeat
 Mandy Norman – Eurovision fan
 Alasdair Rendall – President of OGAE UK
 Sarah Cawood – Former UK semi-final commentator
 SuRie – 
 Joel – Eurovision fan, featured in the BBC's online content for the Eurovision Song Contest 2019
 William Lee Adams – Eurovision blogger for Wiwibloggs
 Zoe London – DJ and Eurovision fan
 Lucy Percy – Eurovision blogger for Wiwibloggs

Participants

The list of participating entries was revealed by the BBC on 15 May 2020. Footage of the original performances for each entry from their original contests was shown. Voting took place via the BBC website; a BBC account was required to vote, and each account holder was able to cast up to three votes. The winner was revealed at the end of the live show, and the top ten were announced on the BBC website following the event's completion.

Interval
Additional content was produced and broadcast following the performances of the competing acts and during the voting period. A pre-recorded interview conducted by Graham Norton with James Newman, the UK representative for the 2020 contest was shown, along with a pre-recorded acoustic performance of his intended Eurovision entry "My Last Breath". Music videos for a number of the entries which were set to compete at the 2020 contest were also featured.

As part of an open call for submissions by the BBC, footage was shown of Eurovision fans and former Eurovision entrants recreating moments from Eurovision history. Applicants could record themselves performing to one of the specified former Eurovision entries and could submit their footage to the BBC for inclusion in the show. The featured songs which applicants could recreate were:

  "Run Away" by SunStroke Project and Olia Tira – Moldovan entry in 2010, notable for launching the "Epic Sax Guy" meme.
  "Boom Bang-a-Bang" by Lulu – British joint winner in 1969
  "Party for Everybody" by Buranovskiye Babushki – Russian entry in 2012
  "Waterline" by Jedward – Irish entry in 2012
  "Flying the Flag (For You)" by Scooch – British entry in 2007
  "Spirit in the Sky" by Keiino – Norwegian entry in 2019
  "Alcohol Is Free" by Koza Mostra and Agathonas Iakovidis – Greek entry in 2013
  "Congratulations" by Cliff Richard – British entry in 1968

See also 
 Eurovision: Europe Shine a Light
 Der kleine Song Contest
 Die Grand Prix Hitliste
 Free European Song Contest
 Eurovision 2020 – das deutsche Finale
 Sveriges 12:a

References

External links
 

2020 song contests
2020 in British television
Come Together
Eurovision Song Contest 2020
2020 in the United Kingdom
2020 in music
May 2020 events in the United Kingdom